Lepidotrichilia is a genus of flowering plants belonging to the family Meliaceae.

Its native range is Ethiopia to Malawi, Madagascar.

Species:

Lepidotrichilia ambrensis 
Lepidotrichilia convallariiodora 
Lepidotrichilia sambiranensis 
Lepidotrichilia volkensii

References

Meliaceae
Meliaceae genera